Kim Leutwyler, is an emerging artist based in Sydney, Australia. She has exhibited her work in multiple galleries across both Australia and the United States. While creating a collection of pieces that utilize different mediums, she most frequently displays paintings that focus on progressive ideas of gender and beauty, as well as people who identify as queer.

Personal life and education 
Born in the United States, Kim Leutwyler spent her formative years traveling and did not spend a substantial amount of time in any given area; she briefly lived in Chicago, Illinois, Arizona, and Connecticut. Leutwyler planned to study accounting after finishing her high school education, but an impulse led her to enroll in the art history program at Arizona State University. She focused almost exclusively on ceramics and printmaking, receiving bachelor's degrees in both Studio Art and Art History. Seeking to further her education, she later graduated from the School of the Art Institute of Chicago with a Painting and Drawing degree as well. Her time spent studying abroad at the University of Auckland in New Zealand left a deep impression, leading her to migrate to Australia in late 2012.

Career 
Leutwyler has created works using a variety of mediums, including installation, ceramics, drawing, and printmaking. Predominately focusing on LGBT-identified and allied women, trans, and gender nonconforming people, her large-scale paintings stimulate dialogue in both mainstream and feminist art worlds. Her portraiture series features a mix of notable activists and artists, including musician and drag queen Trixie Mattel, marriage equality activist Sally Rugg, Olympic athlete Michelle Heyman and DJ, writer and actor Faustina Agolley.

Leutwyler has a deep desire to contribute to the destabilization of gender borders. As Leutwyler herself often explains, her work tends to explore the fine lines between objectification, glorification, and modification. Both the fluidity and overall complexity of identity continue to inspire the artist. Just as people often evolve and adapt to their surrounding social environment, they also do so upon viewing her canvases. With a particularly unique aesthetic, Leutwyler's work features bold and bright blocks of color that meld with the subjects. As she elaborates in an interview:

The 'ideal' female anatomy has changed over time, with varying aesthetics that metamorphose based on age, race, geography and time period. For centuries, humans have embraced body modification as a means of expression, rites of passage, religious beliefs and cultural aesthetics. I paint my friends and the people that I care about most, who embrace a small fraction of current cultural aesthetics and modifications. Body art, plastic surgery and piercings are not uncommon among the women you see in my work.

It was the historical use of patterns to contemplate concepts like beauty, piety, and justice that provides inspiration for much of Leutwyler's work. In fact, many of the subjects in her works are depicted before their favorite patterns. It was this fascination that led her to the discovery of Kehinde Wiley, an artist whose highly naturalistic work displays individuals posed before patterns of various cultures. 

Realizing that that other artists were exploring similar boundaries, she sought further inspiration by investigating art history. This led her to artists like Caravaggio who utilized tenebrism, painting only where the light bounced off of the subject. Inspired by such techniques, she adopted the practice of blending bright and vivid patterns where the shadows of the subject would be.

Another great inspiration was Robert Rauschenberg, an artist whose body of work and legacy garnered Leutwyler's attention. He contributed a substantial amount of money and time to the establishment of organizations that supported such things as human rights and world peace. 

Such philanthropic efforts were something that she admired. Her desire to impact the world through artistic vision remains her ultimate goal, and has led her to the founding of a project, PhilanthropART. She periodically donates a portion of the proceeds from her artwork to this project; the proceeds are then donated to different non-profit organizations.

Leutwyler was a finalist for the 2021 and 2022 Archibald Prize.

Collections 
 Brooklyn Art Library, Brooklyn, New York
 Printmaking Student Association Collection, Arizona State University

References 

Year of birth missing (living people)
Living people
21st-century American women artists
Artists from Sydney
American emigrants to Australia
Arizona State University alumni
School of the Art Institute of Chicago alumni
University of Auckland alumni
Archibald Prize finalists